Kalyana Kalam is a 1982 Indian Tamil-language film directed by Robert–Rajasekar and produced by K. R. Kannan, starring Suhasini and Janagaraj. It was released on 26 January 1982, and failed at the box office.

Plot

Cast 
Suhasini
Janagaraj
P. S. Venkatachalam
S. N. Parvathy
K. K. Soundar
Baby Geetha
Thyagu

Soundtrack 
Soundtrack was composed by Shankar–Ganesh.

Reception 
Kalki panned the film, saying the only positive points were Suhasini's performance and the film's relatively short runtime.

References

External links 
 

1980s Tamil-language films
1982 films
Films scored by Shankar–Ganesh